Michael Keller (born May 2, 1963, in Glendale, California, United States) is a German designer.

Life and career
Michael Keller studied in Munich and at the Parsons School of Design in New York where he received the Cooper Union scholarship. Starting in the mid-1980s, he and Knut Maierhofer ran KMS, a successful design agency. Since its 2012 restructuring, Keller is owner and managing partner of BLACKSPACE, an independent company.
Keller has developed visual identities for numerous brands, companies and cultural events across the world. His work for Audi, Vodafone, Lamborghini, Mercedes and the World Trade Center (“Silverstein Properties“) has received international recognition. KMS was chosen “Red Dot: Agency of the Year“ (2009), and BLACKSPACE “International Automotive Brand Contest: Agency of the Year“. (2013).
Starting in 1998, Michael Keller has created more than 75 trade fair exhibits for numerous brands worldwide, including stands at the Frankfurt Motorshow, the Mondial de l’Automobile Paris, the Geneva Motor Show, the Tokyo Motor Show, the North American International Auto Show and the Beijing International Automotive Exhibition. Many of them were awarded with national and international prizes. Some of Keller's best known works are the design for the Audi museum in Ingolstadt (2000), the launch of the Lamborghini Murciélago on the Mount Etna (2001) in Sicily, the Voestalpine company museum in Linz, Austria (2008), the “Bahrain Pearls Museum“ (2010), the “Qube 3“, an installation for Audi in Barcelona's harbor (2011) as well as Michael Keller's personal exhibition “Black Space. Two views on the creative mind.“ at the Pinakothek der Moderne in Munich (2013).
Since 1999, Keller's works have received 345 national and international design awards, including the Red Dot Grand Prix, Gold at the Cannes Lions International Festival of Creativity, the Golden Nail of the German Art Directors Club, the iF Award in Gold, the Grand Prix at the German “Corporate Design Preis“ as well as the Art Directors Club of New York Award in Gold and the Golden Award Montreux.

Awards (selection)
 8x "Best of the best" at the Red Dot award (3x 2003, 2005, 2009, 2010, 2011, 2014)
 5x Gold at the iF communication design award (2000, 2006, 2008, 2010, 2012)
 6x Gold at the ADAM award, since 2014 FAMAB award (2001, 2005, 2010, 2011, 2014)
 4x Gold at the ADC Germany competition (2005, 2012, 2013, 2014)
 Gold at the ADC New York competition 2001
 Gold at the Contractworld award 2002
 Gold World Medal at The New York Festival 2005
 Gold at the DDC award 2010
 Gold at the ADC Europe competition 2012
 Golden Award Montreux 2012
 Gold at Cannes Lions 2012

Works (selection)
 For Audi: Paris Motor Show (1998, 2000, 2012), Frankfurt Motor Show (1997, 1999, 2001, 2011, 2013), North American International Auto Show (2002, 2013, 2014), Geneva Motor Show (1998, 1999, 2000, 2001, 2002, 2012, 2013, 2014), Tokyo Motor Show (2011)
 For Lamborghini: Paris Motor Show (1998), Frankfurt Motor Show(1999, 2001), Geneva Motor Show (2002, 2003, 2004, 2005, 2006, 2007, 2008, 2009), Bologna Motor Show (1999), Auto Shanghai (2011)
 For Mercedes: Paris Motor Show (2002), Geneva Motor Show (2003, 2006), North American International Auto Show (2005), Tokyo Motor Show (2003)
 For BMW: North American International Auto Show (2008, 2009, 2010)
 For O2: CeBit (2003, 2004, 2005, 2006), IFA Internationale Funkausstellung (2006)
 For Vodafone: CeBit (2010, 2011, 2012), IFA Internationale Funkausstellung (2010, 2011, 2012)
 For Siemens: IFA Internationale Funkausstellung  (2012, 2013)
 For MAN: IAA Commercial Vehicles Hanover (2004, 2005, 2006, 2008, 2010), RAI Amsterdam (2007), Busworld Kortrijk (2011)
 For Heidelberg: Drupa (2008, 2012), Print Chicago (2011), Digi:media (2011), IPEX Birmingham (2010), Polygraphinter Moscow (2009, 2011)

Exhibitions
 Opening ceremony of the international renowned museum “Pinakothek der Moderne“; Munich, September 2002
 “MUSTERRAUM Club + Video Art Project“; Pinakothek der Moderne; Munich, 2002 – 2004
 "Myths – Automobili Lamborghini"; Pinakothek der Moderne; Munich, July 2004
 “Tiefendesign“, red dot design museum; Essen, 2009/2010
 “Black Space. Two views on the creative mind“, Die Neue Sammlung at Pinakothek der Moderne; Munich, May 2013
 "Audi Design Wall“: Die Neue Sammlung at Pinakothek der Moderne; Munich, starting from 07/14/2013 for 5 years

Publications
 "1/1 Architecture and Design: New Synergies“; Christoph Ingenhoven, Michael Keller; Birkhauser; Düsseldorf 2001; 
 "KMS – 12 chapters about a design agency“; Conway Lloyd Morgan; avedition; Ludwigsburg 2002, 
 Michael Keller: "From Attitude to Form"; in: "HQ – high quality. Best of advertising, art, design, photography, writing; Heidelberg 2008

References

External links
 BLACKSPACE
 Frame Magazin about Audi IAA 2013
 About Audi IAA 2013
 About Vodafone flagshipstore
 About Vodafone flagshipstore
 About Audi Design Wall, Pinakothek der Moderne
 About Audi Brand Pavillon Wolfsburg

Living people
1963 births
German graphic designers
Parsons School of Design alumni
People from Glendale, California
Artists from California